The 2nd Deauville American Film Festival took place at Deauville, France from August 31 to September 5, 1976. This year, the festival auctioned film posters of the films screening at the festival, which continued over subsequent years.

The festival was non-competitive in nature and remained so until 1995. The festival introduced Lucien Barrière Prize for Literature, which was awarded every year during the Festival to an American author. The festival contained three different sections in its programme, in which 38 feature films were screened.

Programme

America
A Child Is a Wild Young Thing by Peter Skinner
All Together Now by Randal Kleiser
Beacon Hill by Fielder Cook and Mel Ferber
Film About a Woman Who... by Yvonne Rainer
Gums by Robert J. Kaplan
Let My Puppets Come by Gerard Damian
Loose Ends by David Burton Morris and Victoria Wozniak
Pleasantville by Ker locker
Sandstone by Jonathan Dana and Bunny Dana
Saturday Night at the Baths by David Buckley
Smash-Up on Interstate 5 by John Llewellyn Moxey
The Homecoming by Peter Hall
The UFO Incident by Richard A. Colla
This Is America by Romano Vanderbes
Underground by Emile de Antonio, Mary Lampson and Haskell Wexler

American cinema overview
Ciao! Manhattan by John Palmer and David Weisman
Death Play by Arthur Storch
Emma by John Glenister
Hollywood Boulevard by Allan Arkush and Joe Dante
Hearts of the West by Howard Zieff
Lifeguard by Daniel Petrie
Mustang: The House That Joe Built by Robert Guralnick
Sea Marks by Ronald F. Maxwell and Steven Robman
The Terminal Man by Mike Hodges
The All American Boy by Charles K. Eastman
The Bingo Long Traveling All-Stars & Motor Kings by John Badham
The Challenge... A Tribute to Modern Art by Herbert Kline
The Last Victim by Jim Sotos
The River Niger by Krishna Shah
Tunnel Vision by Neal Israel and Bradley R. Swirnoff

Preview
Buffalo Bill and the Indians, or Sitting Bull's History Lesson by Robert Altman
Death Weekend by William Fruet
Independence Day by Bobby Roth
Cry for Me, Billy by William A. Graham
Mother, Jugs & Speed by Peter Yates
The Entertainer by Donald Wrye
The Gentleman Tramp by Richard Patterson
Jackson County Jail by Mike Miller
The Sunshine Boys by Herbert Ross
The Wild Party by James Ivory

Awards
Lucien Barrière Prize for Literature
Crazy in America by Yves Berger

References

External links
 Official site
 Deauville American Film Festival:1976 at Internet Movie Database

Deac
1976 film festivals
Film festivals in France